The 1955 Grambling Tigers football team represented Grambling State University as a member of the Midwestern Conference (MWC) during the 1955 college football season. In their 13th season under head coach Eddie Robinson, the Tigers compiled a perfect 10–0 record, won the MWC championship, upset Florida A&M in the Orange Blossom Classic, and outscored opponents by a total of 330 to 54. The team was recognized by the Pittsburgh Courier as the black college football national champion for 1955.

Schedule

References

Grambling
Grambling State Tigers football seasons
Black college football national champions
College football undefeated seasons
Grambling Tigers football